The 2008 Cincinnati Reds season was the 139th season for the franchise in Major League Baseball, and their 6th at Great American Ball Park in Cincinnati. The Reds play in the National League's central division; their divisional foes were the Chicago Cubs, St. Louis Cardinals, Milwaukee Brewers, Houston Astros, and Pittsburgh Pirates. The Cubs were the defending champions.  The Reds did not make the playoffs until 2010 season, with their last playoff appearance in 1995.

The 2008 season was manager Dusty Baker's first with the Reds; the 19-year major league veteran outfielder from 1968 to 1986  with the Atlanta Braves, Los Angeles Dodgers, San Francisco Giants, and Oakland Athletics, previously managed the San Francisco Giants from 1993 to 2002 and the Chicago Cubs from 2003 to 2006.  He took the entire 2007 off.  Baker replaced Pete Mackanin, who was named the interim manager on July 1, 2007, after Jerry Narron, coincidentally hired as an interim manager himself, was fired.

Baker was the club's first-ever African American manager.

The season was dedicated to a number of people who died prior to the beginning of the season.  Primarily, former Reds left-handed pitcher and longtime announcer Joe Nuxhall, affectionately known to fans as "The Ol' Lefthander",  who died on November 15, 2007, of cancer.  A patch that said "NUXY" was worn on Reds uniforms.

Other Reds figures who passed were Sheldon "Chief" Bender, a former major league pitcher who developed the Reds' minor league farm system in the late 1960s and into the 1970s. Bender died on February 27, 2008. He worked with general manager Bob Howsam, who had died eight days earlier, to develop the Reds into 1970s powerhouse team nicknamed "The Big Red Machine".

Just 21 games into the 2008 season, the Reds fired 3rd year General Manager Wayne Krivsky and replaced him with former St. Louis Cardinals General Manager Walt Jocketty.  The Reds had at 9–12 record, tied for 4th in the NL Central standings at the time of the firing.  It was the team's worst start since the 2003 season. The Reds again stirred up controversy in Cincinnati in late July and early August by first trading right fielder Ken Griffey Jr., who a month earlier had hit his 600th home run, to the Chicago White Sox at the trade deadline. On their next off day they sent popular left fielder Adam Dunn to the Arizona Diamondbacks for two minor leaguers and pitcher Micah Owings.

Regular season

Season standings

Record vs. opponents

Roster

2008 game log

The following is the Reds' 2008 season game log.

|- align="center" bgcolor="#ffbbbb"
| 1 || March 31 || Diamondbacks || 4–2 || Webb (1–0) || Harang (0–1) || Lyon (1) || 42,498 || 0–1
|-

|- align="center" bgcolor="#bbffbb"
| 2 || April 2 || Diamondbacks || 6–5 || Affeldt (1–0) || Lyon (0–1) || || 14,016 || 1–1
|- align="center" bgcolor="#bbffbb"
| 3 || April 3 || Diamondbacks || 3–2 || Cueto (1–0) || Davis (0–1) || Cordero (1) || 11,987 || 2–1
|- align="center" bgcolor="#ffbbbb"
| 4 || April 4 || Phillies || 8–4 || Kendrick (1–0) || Fogg (0–1) || || 17,905 || 2–2
|- align="center" bgcolor="bbffbb"
| 5 || April 5 || Phillies || 4–3 || Cordero (1–0) || Durbin (0–1) ||  || 23,069 || 3–2
|- align="center" bgcolor="#bbffbb"
| 6 || April 6 || Phillies || 8–2 || Vólquez (1–0) || Myers (0–1) || || 26,566 || 4–2
|- align="center" bgcolor="#ffbbbb"
| 7 || April 7 || Phillies || 5–3 || Hamels (1–1) || Arroyo (0–1) || Lidge (1) || 14,674 || 4–3
|- align="center" bgcolor="ffbbbb"
| 8 || April 8 || @ Brewers || 3 – 2 (10) || Torres (1–0) || Weathers (0–1) || || 27,717 || 4–4
|- align="center" bgcolor="#bbffbb"
| 9 || April 9 || @ Brewers || 12–4 || Fogg (1–1) || Bush (0–2) || || 31,313 || 5–4
|- align="center" bgcolor="#bbffbb"
| 10 || April 10 || @ Brewers || 4–1 || Harang (1–1) || Villanueva (1–1) || Cordero (2) || 25,023 || 6–4
|- align="center" bgcolor="ffbbbb"
| 11 || April 11 || @ Pirates || 1–0 || Grabow (1–0) || Burton (0–1)|| Capps (2) || 13,603 || 6–5
|- align="center" bgcolor="ffbbbb"
| 12 || April 12 || @ Pirates || 4–3 || Snell (2–0) || Lincoln (0–1) || Capps (3) || 18,906 || 6–6
|- align="center" bgcolor="ffbbbb"
| 13 || April 13 || @ Pirates || 9–1 || Gorzelanny (1–1) || Cueto (1–1) || || 11,201 || 6–7
|- align="center" bgcolor="ffbbbb"
| 14 || April 15 || @ Cubs || 9–5 || Dempster (2–0) || Harang (1–2) || || 39,130 || 6–8
|- align="center" bgcolor="ffbbbb"
| 15 || April 16 || @ Cubs || 12–3 ||Zambrano (2–1) || Fogg (1–2)  || || 40,099 || 6–9
|- align="center" bgcolor="#bbffbb"
| 16 || April 17 || @ Cubs || 9–2 || Vólquez (2–0) || Lilly (0–3) || || 39,534 || 7–9
|- align="center" bgcolor="#ffbbbb"
| 17 || April 18 || Brewers || 5–2 || Sheets (3–0) || Arroyo (0–2) || Gagné (5) || 32,629 || 7–10
|- align="center" bgcolor="#ffbbbb"
| 18 || April 19 || Brewers || 5 – 3 (10) || Mota (1–0) || Weathers (0–2) || Gagné (6) || 26,410 || 7–11
|- align="center" bgcolor="#bbffbb"
| 19 || April 20 || Brewers || 4 – 3 (10) || Burton (1–1) || Gagné (1–1) || || 26,902 || 8–11
|- align="center" bgcolor="#ffbbbb"
| 20 || April 21 || Dodgers || 9–3 ||Penny (3–2) ||Belisle (0–1) || || 14,446 || 8–12
|- align="center" bgcolor="#bbffbb"
| 21 || April 22 || Dodgers || 8–1 || Vólquez (3–0) || Kuo (0–1) ||  || 14,763 || 9–12
|- align="center" bgcolor="#ffbbbb"
| 22 || April 23 || Astros || 9–3 || Sampson (1–2) || Arroyo (0–3) || || 16,017 || 9–13
|- align="center" bgcolor="#ffbbbb"
| 23 || April 24 || Astros || 5–3 || Cassel (1–0) || Cueto (1–2) || Valverde (3) || 17,403 || 9–14
|- align="center" bgcolor="#ffbbbb"
| 24 || April 25 || @ Giants || 3–1 || Sánchez (2–1) || Harang (1–3) || Wilson (8) || 34,657 || 9–15
|- align="center" bgcolor="#bbffbb"
| 25 || April 26 || @ Giants || 10–9 || Belisle (1–1) || Hennessy (1–1) || Cordero (3) || 34,215 || 10–15
|- align="center" bgcolor="#bbffbb"
| 26 || April 27 || @ Giants || 10–1 || Vólquez (4–0) || Zito (0–6) || || 39,050 || 11–15
|- align="center" bgcolor="#bbffbb"
| 27 || April 28 || @ Cardinals || 4–3 || Arroyo (1–3) || Wellemeyer (2–1) || Cordero (4) || 37,229 || 12–15
|- align="center" bgcolor="#ffbbbb"
| 28 || April 29 || @ Cardinals || 7–2 || Piñeiro (2–2) || Cueto (1–3) || || 35,356 || 12–16
|- align="center" bgcolor="#ffbbbb"
| 29 || April 30 || @ Cardinals || 5–2 || Looper (4–1) || Harang (1–4) || Isringhausen (9) || 40,629 ||12–17
|-

|- align="center" bgcolor="#ffbbbb"
| 30 || May 2 || @ Braves || 2–0 || Hudson (4–2) || Vólquez (4–1) || || 32,057 ||12–18
|- align="center" bgcolor="#ffbbbb"
| 31 || May 3 || @ Braves || 9–1 || Reyes (1–0) || Belisle (1–2) || || 37,969 ||12–19
|- align="center" bgcolor="#ffbbbb"
| 32 || May 4 || @ Braves || 14–7 || Ring (1–0) || Arroyo (1–4) || || 33,750 ||12–20
|- align="center" bgcolor="#bbffbb"
| 33 || May 5 || Cubs || 5–3 || Cueto (2–3) || Dempster (4–1) || Cordero (5) || 20,289 || 13–20
|- align="center" bgcolor="#ffbbbb"
| 34 || May 6 || Cubs || 3–0 || Zambrano (5–1) || Harang (1–5) || Wood (5) || 21,153 || 13–21
|- align="center" bgcolor="#bbffbb"
| 35 || May 7 || Cubs || 9–0 || Vólquez (5–1) || Lieber (2–2) || || 28,418 || 14–21
|- align="center" bgcolor="bbbbbb"
| — || May 9 || @ Mets || colspan=6|Postponed (rain) Rescheduled for May 10 
|- align="center" bgcolor="#ffbbbb"
| 36 || May 10 || @ Mets || 12–6 || Santana (4–2) || Belisle (1–3) || || 55,186 || 14–22
|- align="center" bgcolor="#bbffbb"
| 37 || May 10 || @ Mets || 7–1 || Arroyo (2–4) || Pelfrey (2–3) || || 47,673 || 15–22
|- align="center" bgcolor="ffbbbb"
| 38 || May 11 || @ Mets || 8–3 || Pérez (3–3) ||  Cueto (2–4) || || 49,264 || 15–23
|- align="center" bgcolor="#bbffbb"
| 39 || May 12 || Marlins || 8–7 || Harang (2–5) || Tankersley (0–1) || Cordero (6) || 15,233 || 16–23
|- align="center" bgcolor="#bbffbb"
| 40 || May 13 || Marlins || 5–3 || Vólquez (6–1) || Hendrickson (5–2) || Cordero (7) || 14,015 || 17–23
|- align="center" bgcolor="#bbffbb"
| 41 || May 14 || Marlins || 7 – 6 (10) || Burton (2–1) || Pinto (1–2) || || 12,756 || 18–23
|- align="center" bgcolor="bbbbbb"
| - || May 15 || Marlins || colspan=6|Postponed (rain)
|- align="center" bgcolor="#bbffbb"
| 42 || May 16 || Indians † || 4–3 || Weathers (1–2) || Lewis (0–2) || Cordero (8) || 33,433 || 19–23
|- align="center" bgcolor="#bbffbb"
| 43 || May 17 || Indians † || 4–2 || Bray (1–0) || Kobayashi (1–2) || || 42,023 || 20–23
|- align="center" bgcolor="#bbffbb"
| 44 || May 18 || Indians † || 6–4 || Vólquez (7–1) || Lee (6–1) || Cordero (9) || 34,612 || 21–23
|- align="center" bgcolor="ffbbbb"
| 45 || May 19 || @ Dodgers || 6–5 || Saito (2–1) || Weathers (1–3) || || 34,669 || 21–24
|- align="center" bgcolor="ffbbbb"
| 46 || May 20 || @ Dodgers || 4–1 || Billingsley (4–5) || Belisle (1–4) || Saito (7) || 34,306 || 21–25
|- align="center" bgcolor="ffbbbb"
| 47 || May 21 || @ Dodgers || 5–2 || Kuroda (2–3) || Cueto (2–5) || Saito (8) || 33,224 || 21–26
|- align="center" bgcolor="ffbbbb"
| 48 || May 22 || @ Padres || 8–2 || Wolf (3–4) || Harang (2–6) || || 22,047 || 21–27
|- align="center" bgcolor="#bbffbb"
| 49 || May 23 || @ Padres || 3–2 || Weathers (2–3) || Hoffman (0–3) || Cordero (10) || 26,422 || 22–27
|- align="center" bgcolor="#bbffbb"
| 50 || May 24 || @ Padres || 7–2 || Arroyo (3–4) || Ledezma (0–2) || || 27,499 || 23–27
|- align="center" bgcolor="ffbbbb"
| 51 || May 25 || @ Padres || 12 – 9 (18)  || Banks (1–0) || Vólquez (7–2) || || 36,508 || 23–28
|- align="center" bgcolor="#bbffbb"
| 52 || May 27 || Pirates || 9–6 || Cueto (3–5) || Snell (2–4) || Cordero (11) || 17,694 || 24–28
|- align="center" bgcolor="#bbffbb"
| 53 || May 28 || Pirates || 9–1 || Arroyo (4–4) || Gorzelanny (4–5) || || 15,797 || 25–28
|- align="center" bgcolor="#ffbbbb"
| 54 || May 29 || Pirates || 7–2 || Dumatrait (2–2) || Harang (2–7) || || 18,142 || 25–29
|- align="center" bgcolor="#bbffbb"
| 55 || May 30 || Braves || 3 – 2 (11) || Mercker (1–0) || Ring (1–1) || || 37,015 || 26–29
|- align="center" bgcolor="#bbffbb"
| 56 || May 31 || Braves || 8 – 7 (10) || Cordero (2–0) || Acosta (3–2) || || 38,585 || 27–29
|-

|- align="center" bgcolor="#bbffbb"
| 57 || June 1 || Braves || 6–2 || Cueto (4–5) || Hudson (7–4) || || 35,942 || 28–29
|- align="center" bgcolor="ffbbbb"
| 58 || June 2 || @ Phillies || 5–4 || Kendrick (5–2) || Arroyo (4–5) || Lidge (14) || 38,530 || 28–30
|- align="center" bgcolor="ffbbbb"
| 59 || June 3 || @ Phillies || 3–2 || Eaton (2–3) || Harang (2–8) || Lidge (15) || 45,096 || 28–31
|- align="center" bgcolor="bbffbb"
| 60 || June 4 || @ Phillies || 2–0 || Vólquez (8–2) || Myers (3–7) || Cordero (12) || 45,223 || 29–31
|- align="center" bgcolor="ffbbbb"
| 61 || June 5 || @ Phillies || 5–0 || Hamels (6–4) || Bailey (0–1) || || 45,492 || 29–32
|- align="center" bgcolor="bbffbb"
| 62 || June 6 || @ Marlins || 11–3 || Cueto (5–5) || Miller (4–5) || || 16,084 || 30–32
|- align="center" bgcolor="ffbbbb"
| 63 || June 7 || @ Marlins || 8–7 || Badenhop (2–3) || Cordero (2–1) || || 25,289 || 30–33
|- align="center" bgcolor="ffbbbb"
| 64 || June 8 || @ Marlins || 9–2 || Tucker (1–0) || Harang (2–9) || || 12,444 || 30–34
|- align="center" bgcolor="bbffbb"
| 65 || June 9 || @ Marlins || 9–4 || Vólquez (9–2) || Hendrickson (7–4) || || 16,003 || 31–34
|- align="center" bgcolor="#ffbbbb"
| 66 || June 10 || Cardinals || 7–2 || Boggs (1–0) || Bailey (0–2) || || 34,234 || 31–35
|- align="center" bgcolor="#ffbbbb" 
| 67 || June 11 || Cardinals || 10–0 || Looper (8–5) || Cueto (5–6) || || 19,851 || 31–36
|- align="center" bgcolor="#bbffbb"
| 68 || June 12 || Cardinals || 6–2 || Burton (3–1) || Worrell (0–1) || || 22,121 || 32–36
|- align="center" bgcolor="#bbffbb"
| 69 || June 13 || Red Sox † || 3–1 || Harang (3–9) || Masterson (3–1) || Cordero (13) || 38,855 || 33–36
|- align="center" bgcolor="#ffbbbb"
| 70 || June 14 || Red Sox † || 6 – 4 (10) || Papelbon (3–2) || Lincoln (0–2) || Hansen (1) || 40,947 || 33–37
|- align="center" bgcolor="#ffbbbb"
| 71 || June 15 || Red Sox † || 9–0 || Beckett (7–4) || Bailey (0–3) || || 39,958 || 33–38
|- align="center" bgcolor="#ffbbbb"
| 72 || June 17 || Dodgers || 3–1 || Billingsley (5–7) || Cueto (5–7) || Saito (9) || 26,906 || 33–39
|- align="center" bgcolor="#ffbbbb"
| 73 || June 18 || Dodgers || 6–1 || Lowe (5–6) || Arroyo (4–6) || || 20,055 || 33–40
|- align="center" bgcolor="#ffbbbb"
| 74 || June 19 || Dodgers || 7–4 || Stults (1–0) || Harang (3–10) || Saito (10) || 30,136 || 33–41
|- align="center" bgcolor="#bbffbb"
| 75 || June 20 || @ Yankees † || 4–2 || Vólquez (10–2) || Mussina (10–5) || Cordero (14) || 53,421 || 34–41
|- align="center" bgcolor="#bbffbb"
| 76 || June 21 || @ Yankees † || 6–0 || Bray (2–0) || Giese (1–2) || || 54,509 || 35–41
|- align="center" bgcolor="#ffbbbb"
| 77 || June 22 || @ Yankees † || 4–1 || Pettitte (8–5) || Cueto (5–8) || Rivera (21) || 54,234 || 35–42
|- align="center" bgcolor="#ffbbbb"
| 78 || June 24 || @ Blue Jays † || 14–1 || Burnett (7–7) || Arroyo (4–7) || || 28,153 || 35–43
|- align="center" bgcolor="#bbffbb"
| 79 || June 25 || @ Blue Jays † || 6–5 || Burton (4–1) || Wolfe (0–2) || Cordero (15) || 25,437 || 36–43
|- align="center" bgcolor="#ffbbbb"
| 80 || June 26 || @ Blue Jays † || 7–1 || Litsch (8–4) || Vólquez (10–3) || || 25,129 || 36–44
|- align="center" bgcolor="#ffbbbb"
| 81 || June 27 || @ Indians † || 6–0 || Sabathia (6–8) || Thompson (0–1) || || 34,844 || 36–45
|- align="center" bgcolor="#bbffbb"
| 82 || June 28 || @ Indians † || 5–0 || Cueto (6–8) || Byrd (3–9) || || 39,506 || 37–45
|- align="center" bgcolor="#bbffbb"
| 83 || June 29 || @ Indians † || 9–5 || Arroyo (5–7) || Laffey (4–5) || || 37,079 || 38–45
|- align="center" bgcolor="#bbffbb"
| 84 || June 30 || Pirates || 4–3 || Cordero (3–1) || Capps (1–3) || || 20,745 || 39–45
|-

|- align="center" bgcolor="#ffbbbb"
| 85 || July 1 || Pirates || 6–5 (11) || Capps (2–3) || Weathers (2–4) || Sánchez (1) || 19,345 || 39–46
|- align="center" bgcolor="#ffbbbb"
| 86 || July 2 || Pirates || 9–5 || Bautista (1–1) || Thompson (0–2) || || 16,890 || 39–47
|- align="center" bgcolor="#bbffbb"
| 87 || July 3 || Nationals || 5–3 || Cueto (7–8) || Colomé (2–2) || Cordero (16)|| 23,259 || 40–47
|- align="center" bgcolor="#bbffbb"
| 88 || July 4 || Nationals || 3–0 || Arroyo (6–7) || Bergmann (1–6) || Cordero (17) || 22,626 || 41–47
|- align="center" bgcolor="#bbffbb"
| 89 || July 5 || Nationals || 3–2 || Cordero (4–1) || Hanrahan (5–3) || || 37,121 || 42–47
|- align="center" bgcolor="#bbffbb"
| 90 || July 6 || Nationals || 6–5 || Vólquez (11–3) || Balester (1–1) || Cordero (18) || 28,814 || 43–47
|- align="center" bgcolor="#ffbbbb"
| 91 || July 8 || @ Cubs || 7–3 || Dempster (10–3) || Harang (3–11) || || 41,360 || 43–48
|- align="center" bgcolor="#ffbbbb"
| 92 || July 9 || @ Cubs || 5–1 || Zambrano (10–3) || Cueto (7–9) || Wood (23) || 41,605 || 43–49
|- align="center" bgcolor="#bbffbb"
| 93 || July 10 || @ Cubs || 12–7 || Arroyo (7–7) || Lilly (9–6) || || 41,459 || 44–49
|- align="center" bgcolor="#bbffbb"
| 94 || July 11 || @ Brewers || 6–5 || Lincoln (1–2) || Shouse (3–1) || Cordero (19) || 41,229 || 45–49
|- align="center" bgcolor="#bbffbb"
| 95 || July 12 || @ Brewers || 8–2 || Vólquez (12–3) || McClung (5–5) || || 43,556 || 46–49
|- align="center" bgcolor="#ffbbbb"
| 96 || July 13 || @ Brewers || 3–2 || Sabathia (8–8) || Weathers (2–5) || || 42,108 || 46–50
|- align="center" bgcolor="#ffbbbb"
| 97 || July 17 || Mets || 10–8 || Sánchez (4–1) || Cordero (4–2) || Wagner (23) || 23,681 || 46–51
|- align="center" bgcolor="#bbffbb"
| 98 || July 18 || Mets || 5–2 || Arroyo (8–7) || Maine (8–7) || Cordero (20) || 31,922 || 47–51
|- align="center" bgcolor="#bbffbb"
| 99 || July 19 || Mets || 7–2 || Fogg (2–2) || Pérez (6–6) || || 41,959 || 48–51
|- align="center" bgcolor="#ffbbbb"
| 100 || July 20 || Mets || 7–5 || Sánchez (5–1) || Bray (2–1) || Wagner (24) || 31,195 || 48–52
|- align="center" bgcolor="#ffbbbb"
| 101 || July 21 || Padres || 6–4 || Hensley (1–0) || Cordero (4–3) || Hoffman (18) || 18,177 || 48–53
|- align="center" bgcolor="#bbffbb"
| 102 || July 22 || Padres || 4 – 3 (11) || Majewski (1–0) || Corey (1–3) || || 21,233 || 49–53
|- align="center" bgcolor="#bbffbb"
| 103 || July 23 || Padres || 9–5 || Arroyo (9–7) || Meredith (0–3) || Cordero (21) || 22,970 || 50–53
|- align="center" bgcolor="#ffbbbb"
| 104 || July 25 || Rockies || 7–2 || Cook (13–6) || Vólquez (12–4) || || 27,501 || 50–54
|- align="center" bgcolor="#ffbbbb"
| 105 || July 26 || Rockies || 5–1 || de la Rosa (5–5) || Bailey (0–4) || || 33,981 || 50–55
|- align="center" bgcolor="ffbbbb"
| 106 || July 27 || Rockies || 11–0 || Jiménez (7–9) || Fogg (2–3) || || 28,246 || 50–56
|- align="center" bgcolor="ffbbbb"
| 107 || July 28 || @ Astros || 5–4 || Oswalt (8–8) || Cueto (7–10) || Valverde (27) || 31,783 || 50–57
|- align="center" bgcolor="ffbbbb"
| 108 || July 29 || @ Astros || 6–2 || Moehler (6–4) || Arroyo (9–8) || Wright (1) || 34,015 || 50–58
|- align="center" bgcolor="bbffbb"
| 109 || July 30 || @ Astros || 9–5 || Vólquez (13–4) || Rodríguez (6–4) || || 30,272 || 51–58
|-

|- align="center" bgcolor="ffbbbb"
| 110 || August 1 || @ Nationals || 5–2 || Pérez (4–8) || Bailey (0–5) || || 30,572 || 51–59
|- align="center" bgcolor="ffbbbb"
| 111 || August 2 || @ Nationals || 10–6 || Manning (1–2) || Lincoln (1–3) || || 30,970 || 51–60
|- align="center" bgcolor="ffbbbb"
| 112 || August 3 || @ Nationals || 4–2 || Balester (2–3) || Cueto (7–11) || Hanrahan (1) || 32,939 || 51–61
|- align="center" bgcolor="bbffbb"
| 113 || August 4 || Brewers || 6–3 || Arroyo (10–8) || Parra (9–5) || Cordero (22) || 24,706 || 52–61
|- align="center" bgcolor="ffbbbb"
| 114 || August 5 || Brewers || 8–1 || Bush (6–9) || Vólquez || || 24,739 || 52–62
|- align="center" bgcolor="ffbbbb"
| 115 || August 6 || Brewers || 6–3 || Suppan (7–7) || Bailey (0–6) || Torres (22) || 26,602 || 52–63
|- align="center" bgcolor="ffbbbb"
| 116 || August 7 || Astros || 7–4 || Oswalt (9–8) || Josh Fogg (2–4) || || 27,378 || 52–64
|- align="center" bgcolor="ffbbbb"
| 117 || August 8 || Astros || 9 – 5 (10) || Sampson (6–4) || Cordero (4–4) || || 25,652 || 52–65
|- align="center" bgcolor="ffbbbb"
| 118 || August 9 || Astros || 3–1 || Moehler (8–4) || Arroyo (10–9) || Valverde (28) || 26,044 || 52–66
|- align="center" bgcolor="ffbbbb"
| 119 || August 10 || Astros || 13–4 || Rodríguez (7–4) || Harang (3–12) || || 30,789 || 52–67
|- align="center" bgcolor="bbffbb"
| 120 || August 12 || @ Pirates || 5–1 || Vólquez (14–5) || Karstens (2–1) || || 23.686 || 53–67
|- align="center" bgcolor="ffbbbb"
| 121 || August 13 || @ Pirates || 5–2 || Maholm (8–7) || Fogg (2–5) || Grabow (3) || 15,787 || 53–68
|- align="center" bgcolor="bbffbb"
| 122 || August 14 || @ Pirates || 3–1 || Cueto (8–11) || Snell (4–10) || Cordero (23) || 35,439 || 54–68
|- align="center" bgcolor="ffbbbb"
| 123 || August 15 || Cardinals || 5–3 || Thompson (5–2) || Arroyo (10–10) || Perez (4) || 26,234 || 54–69
|- align="center" bgcolor="ffbbbb"
| 124 || August 16 || Cardinals || 9–3 || Piñeiro (6–5) || Harang (3–13) || || 30,713 || 54–70
|- align="center" bgcolor="bbffbb"
| 125 || August 17 || Cardinals || 7–3 || Vólquez (15–5) || Lohse (13–10) || || 37,468 || 55–70
|- align="center" bgcolor="ffbbbb"
| 126 || August 19 || @ Cubs || 5–0 || Harden (3–1) || Cueto (8–12) || || 41,208 || 55–71
|- align="center" bgcolor="bbffbb"
| 127 || August 20 || @ Cubs || 2–1 || Arroyo (11–10) || Lilly (12–7) || || 40,509 || 56–71
|- align="center" bgcolor="ffbbbb"
| 128 || August 21 || @ Cubs || 3–2 || Zambrano (13–5) || Fogg (2–6) || Wood (26) || 40,730 || 56–72
|- align="center" bgcolor="bbffbb"
| 129 || August 22 || @ Rockies || 8–5 || Harang (4–13) || Hernández (11–10) || Cordero (25) || 30,337 || 57–72
|- align="center" bgcolor="ffbbbb"
| 130 || August 23 || @ Rockies || 7–6 || Vizcaíno (1–0) || Lincoln (1–4) || Fuentes (25) || 42,282 || 57–73
|- align="center" bgcolor="ffbbbb"
| 131 || August 24 || @ Rockies || 4–3 (12) || Speier (2–1) || Lincoln (1–5) || || 31,173 || 57–74
|- align="center" bgcolor="bbffbb"
| 132 || August 26 || @Astros || 2–1 || Arroyo (12–10) || Geary (2–3) || || 30,395 || 58–74
|- align="center" bgcolor="ffbbbb"
| 133 || August 27 || @ Astros || 4–1 || Oswalt (12–9) || Fogg (2–7) || Valverde (34) || 30,741 || 58–75
|- align="center" bgcolor="ffbbbb"
| 134 || August 28 || @ Astros || 3–2 || Backe (9–12) || Harang (4–14) || Valverde (35) || 30,028 || 58–76
|- align="center" bgcolor="bbffbb"
| 135 || August 29 || Giants || 11–7 || Vólquez (16–5) || Zito (8–16) || || 25,445 || 59–76
|- align="center" bgcolor="bbffbb"
| 136 || August 30 || Giants || 7–6 || Lincoln (2–5) || Taschner (3–2) || Cordero (26) || 21,729 || 60–76
|- align="center" bgcolor="bbffbb"
| 137 || August 31 || Giants || 9–3 || Arroyo (13–10) || Cain (8–11) || || 26,519 || 61–76
|-

|- align="center" bgcolor="ffbbbb"
| 138 || September 2 || Pirates || 3–2 || Snell (6–10) || Harang (4–15) ||Capps (18) || 18,024 || 61–77
|- align="center" bgcolor="ffbbbb"
| 139 || September 3 || Pirates || 6–5 || Yates (5–3) || Affeldt (1–1) || Capps (19) || 18,561 || 61–78
|- align="center" bgcolor="bbffbb"
| 140 || September 4 || Pirates || 8–6 || Masset (2–0) || Hansen (1–6) || Cordero (27) || 20,626 || 62–78
|- align="center" bgcolor="bbffbb"
| 141 || September 5 || Cubs || 10–2 || Arroyo (14–10) || Lilly (13–9) || || 31,213 || 63–78
|- align="center" bgcolor="ffbbbb"
| 142 || September 6 || Cubs || 14–9 || Marquis (10–8) || Cueto (8–13) || || 41,204 || 63–79
|- align="center" bgcolor="bbffbb"
| 143 || September 7 || Cubs || 4–3 || Cordero (5–4) || Wood (4–4) || || 37,540 || 64–79
|- align="center" bgcolor="bbffbb"
| 144 || September 8 || @ Brewers || 5–4 || Burton (5–1) || Torres (6–5) || Cordero (28) || 30,867 || 65–79
|- align="center" bgcolor="bbffbb"
| 145 || September 9 || @ Brewers || 5–4 || Adkins (1–0) || McClung (5–6) || Cordero (29) || 30,312 || 66–79
|- align="center" bgcolor="ffbbbb"
| 146 || September 10 || @ Brewers || 4–3 || Mota (5–5) || Weathers (2–6) || Torres (27) || 30,124 || 66–80
|- align="center" bgcolor="ffbbbb"
| 147 || September 12 || @ Diamondbacks || 3–2 || Webb (20–7) || Harang (4–16) || Qualls (3) || 29,046 || 66–81
|- align="center" bgcolor="bbffbb"
| 148 || September 13 || @ Diamondbacks || 3–2 || Weathers (3–6) || Peña (1–2) || Cordero (30) || 45,075 || 67–81
|- align="center" bgcolor="bbffbb"
| 149 || September 14 || @ Diamondbacks || 2–1 || Weathers (4–6) || Rauch (4–8) || Cordero (31) || 27,297 || 68–81
|- align="center" bgcolor="bbffbb"
| 150 || September 16 || Cardinals || 7–2 || Arroyo (15–10) || Looper (12–13) || || 19,708 || 69–81
|- align="center" bgcolor="bbffbb"
| 151 || September 17 || Cardinals || 3–0 || Harang (5–16) || Wellemeyer (12–8) || || 14,850 || 70–81
|- align="center" bgcolor="ffbbbb"
| 152 || September 18 || Cardinals || 5–4 || Lohse (14–6) || Vólquez (16–6) || Motte (1) || 14,041 || 70–82
|- align="center" bgcolor="bbffbb"
| 153 || September 19 || Brewers || 11–2 || Ramírez (1–0) || Suppan (10–10) || || 20,855 || 71–82
|- align="center" bgcolor="bbffbb"
| 154 || September 20 || Brewers || 4–3 || Cueto (9–13) || Sabathia (9–2) || Cordero (32) || 24,440 || 72–82
|- align="center" bgcolor="ffbbbb"
| 155 || September 21 || Brewers || 8–1 || Coffey (1–0) || Arroyo (15–11) || || 22,624 || 72–83
|- align="center" bgcolor="bbffbb"
| 156 || September 22 || Marlins || 7–5 || Harang (6–16) || Miller (6–10) || Cordero (33) || 13,565 || 73–83
|- align="center" bgcolor="bbffbb"
| 157 || September 23 || @ Astros || 2–1 || Vólquez (17–6) || Rodríguez (8–7) || Cordero (34) || 27,361 || 74–83
|- align="center" bgcolor="ffbbbb"
| 158 || September 24 || @ Astros || 5–0 || Wolf (12–12) || Ramírez (1–1) || || 26,103 || 74–84
|- align="center" bgcolor="ffbbbb"
| 159 || September 25 || @ Astros || 8–6 || Roy Oswalt (17–10) || Cueto (9–14) || Valverde (43) || 31,204 || 74–85
|- align="center" bgcolor="ffbbbb"
| 160 || September 26 || @ Cardinals || 7–6 || Franklin (6–6) || Bray (2–2) || || 44,709 || 74–86
|- align="center" bgcolor="ffbbbb"
| 161 || September 27 || @ Cardinals || 8–5 || Wellemeyer (13–9) || Harang (6–17) || || 43,682 || 74–87
|- align="center" bgcolor="ffbbbb"
| 162 || September 28 || @ Cardinals || 11–4 || Thompson (6–3) || Pettyjohn (0–1) || || 43,300 || 74–88
|-

Player stats

Batting
Note: G = Games played; AB = At bats; R = Runs; H = Hits;  HR = Home runs; RBI = Runs batted in; SB = Stolen bases; AVG = Batting average

Starting and other pitchers
Note: G = Games pitched; IP = Innings pitched; W= Wins; L = Losses; K = Strikeouts; ERA = Earned run average; WHIP = Walks + Hits Per Innings Pitched

Relief pitchers
Note: G = Games pitched; IP = Innings pitched; W= Wins; L = Losses;  SV = Saves; K = Strikeouts; ERA = Earned run average; WHIP = Walks + Hits Per Innings Pitched

Farm system

References
2008 Cincinnati Reds season at Baseball Reference

Cincinnati Reds seasons
Cincinnati Reds
Cinc